WIRL (1290 AM) is a radio station  broadcasting a conservative talk format. Licensed to Peoria, Illinois, United States, the station serves the Peoria area and broadcasts in AM stereo.  The station is currently owned by Midwest Communications, Inc.

WIRL can also be heard in HD on sister station WPBG-HD3.  WIRL itself is not licensed to broadcast in HD.

History
WIRL began broadcasting February 18, 1948, on 1290 kHz with 5,000 Watts of power (full-time). It was licensed to Illinois Valley Broadcasting Company with studios in the Jefferson Building in Peoria.

WIRL was most famous as a successful Top 40 radio station from 1960 until approximately 1984. During its tenure, its only competition was daytime-only WPEO 1020 AM.  Popular disc jockeys were Robyn Weaver, Lee Ranson, Jerry Barr, Jim French, Timmy "Old Weird" West, Bill McCluggage, Lee Malcolm, Wayne R. Miller, Howard Taylor, Pete Stewart, VLJ, Charlie O'Day, John Sebastian Bachman, Ann Holub, Dave Phillips, Steve Young, Scott Robbins, Ron Thorn, with Mark Wainwright and many more.  For many years WIRL broadcast Bradley Braves basketball games not aired on WMBD (AM).

In the late 1970s, FM station WKZW 93.3 a.k.a. KZ93 (now WPBG) began programming a Top 40 format and siphoned away many listeners from WIRL until 1984, when they began to evolve into a full service personality and adult contemporary station.  Personalities included Lee Malcolm, Gene Konrad, Kurt Schaeffer, Denise Henley, Steve Larson, Marc Truelove, Steve Young and Darryl Parks. The adult contemporary format lasted until the early 1990s; the station also programmed oldies, standards, and sports talk.

In November 2000, the station changed to all-sports "Fox Sports 1290" with the callsign WWFS.  The station returned to the WIRL call sign when it adopted the classic country format in March 2005. A station from New York now uses the callsign "WWFS".

On March 15, 2013, WIRL changed their format to oldies, branded as "Good Time Oldies" and began simulcasting on FM translator W274BM 102.7 FM.

On February 4, 2019, Alpha Media announced that it would sell its Peoria cluster to Midwest Communications for $21.6 million. The sale closed on April 30, 2019.

On February 28, 2022, WIRL 1290 AM has switched to a conservative/far-right wing talk radio format, branded as "Freedom 95.9" (simulcasting 95.9 W240DM Peoria and WPBG-HD3). The oldies format is still available on 102.7 W274BM and WPBG-HD2

Previous logo

(WIRL's logo from 2005 to 2013 under former classic country format)

(WIRL's logo from 2013 to 2022 under previous oldies format)

References

External links

The Big 1290 — tribute site with pictures and soundclip archives
FCC History Cards for WIRL

Radio stations established in 1948
IRL
Midwest Communications radio stations